Cardinals are senior members of the clergy of the Catholic Church. They are almost always bishops and generally hold important roles within the church, such as leading prominent archdioceses or heading dicasteries within the Roman Curia. Cardinals are created in consistories by the pope, and one of their foremost duties is the election of a new pope – invariably from among their number, although not strictly a requirement – when the Holy See is vacant (sede vacante), following the death or resignation of the reigning pontiff. The body of all cardinals is collectively known as the College of Cardinals.

Under current ecclesiastical law, as defined by the apostolic constitution Universi Dominici gregis, only cardinals who have not passed their 80th birthdays on the day on which the Holy See becomes vacant are eligible to participate in a papal conclave to elect a new pope. The same apostolic constitution also specifies a maximum of 120 cardinal electors who can participate in a conclave, but makes no provision in case this number is exceeded; this has often happened, although never at the time of a conclave. Cardinals may also be created in pectore ('in the breast'), in which case their identities are not publicly revealed by the pope; they do not enjoy the privileges of a cardinal until their names are published. The creations of any such cardinals who have not been revealed at the pope's death or resignation automatically lapse.

 there are 223 cardinals, 123 of whom are cardinal electors. The most recent consistory for the creation of cardinals was held on 27 August 2022, when Pope Francis created 20 cardinals, including 16 cardinal electors.  Domenico Calcagno was the most recent cardinal elector to turn 80, on 3 February 2023; and Dominik Duka  will be the next cardinal elector to turn 80, on 26 April 2023. The most recent death of a cardinal was that of George Pell, on 10 January 2023, at the age of 81.

Cardinals 
The College of Cardinals is divided into three orders, with formal precedence in the following sequence:

 Cardinal bishops (CB): the six cardinals who are assigned the titles of the seven suburbicarian dioceses in the vicinity of Rome by the pope, plus a few other cardinals who have been exceptionally co-opted into the order, as well as patriarchs who head one of the Eastern Catholic Churches. The two most senior cardinal bishops, who are elected by the cardinal bishops from among themselves (excluding the Eastern Catholic patriarchs) and approved by the pope, are the dean and the vice dean, currently Giovanni Battista Re and Leonardo Sandri, respectively. The latter is also the senior cardinal bishop among the cardinal electors.
 Cardinal priests (CP): bishops typically in charge of dioceses around the world, as well as former cardinal deacons who have opted to be elevated to the order. The most senior cardinal priest is the protopriest, currently Michael Michai Kitbunchu; among the cardinal electors, the senior cardinal priest is Vinko Puljić.
 Cardinal deacons (CD): bishops who work in the Roman Curia or the diplomatic service of the Holy See, and all other clergy, including priests who have been granted a dispensation not to be consecrated a bishop. They have the choice of opting to become cardinal priests after having been cardinal deacons for ten years. The most senior cardinal deacon is the protodeacon, currently Renato Raffaele Martino; among the cardinal electors, the senior cardinal deacon is James Michael Harvey and the junior cardinal deacon is Fernando Vérgez Alzaga.

For cardinal bishops (excluding the Eastern Catholic patriarchs), the dean is first in precedence, followed by the vice-dean and then, in order of appointment as cardinal bishops, by the remainder. For cardinal bishops who are Eastern Catholic patriarchs, for cardinal priests and for cardinal deacons, precedence is determined by the date of the consistory in which they were created cardinals and then by the order in which they appeared in the official announcement or bulletin.

All cardinals listed are members of the Latin Church unless otherwise stated. Cardinals belonging to institutes of consecrated life or to societies of apostolic life are indicated by the relevant post-nominal letters.

Demographics of the College of Cardinals 
At present,  of  cardinals are eligible to participate in a papal conclave. The number of votes required to be elected pope with a two-thirds supermajority, if all  cardinal electors were to participate{{#ifexpr:>120|(notwithstanding the maximum of 120 specified in Universi Dominici gregis)}}, would be .

This table indicates the number of current cardinals created by each pope and belonging to each order of the College.

Cardinals by particular church sui iuris 
While most cardinals belong to the Latin Church, which encompasses the vast majority of Catholics, a small number of cardinals belong to one of the twenty-three autonomous (sui iuris) Eastern Catholic Churches. At present, there are six Eastern Catholic cardinals, including four cardinal electors, belonging to six particular churches sui iuris:

 Béchara Boutros Raï (Maronite Church)
 Louis Raphaël I Sako (Chaldean Church), cardinal elector
 George Alencherry (Syro-Malabar Church), cardinal elector
 Lucian Mureșan (Romanian Greek Church)
 Baselios Cleemis Thottunkal (Syro-Malankara Church), cardinal elector
 Berhaneyesus Demerew Souraphiel (Ethiopian Church), cardinal elector

Cardinals by institute of consecrated life or society of apostolic life 
At present, there are 52 cardinals, including 30 cardinal electors, who are members of the religious life, representing 28 institutes of consecrated life and societies of apostolic life. Common names for members, if different, are given in brackets in this table.

Cardinals by continent 
For the purposes of this article, countries are grouped into continents generally according to the regions of the United Nations geoscheme; for the region of the Americas, North America comprises the subregions of Northern America, Central America and the Caribbean, while South America comprises the remaining subregion of the same name.

Cardinals by country 
At present, 88 countries are represented in the College of Cardinals, including 66 with at least one cardinal elector. The countries with the greatest numbers of cardinals are Italy (forty-seven), the United States (sixteen), and Spain (twelve). Among the cardinal electors, the countries with the greatest numbers are Italy (sixteen), the United States (ten), and Brazil and Spain jointly (six each).

See also 
 Cardinals created by John Paul II
 Cardinals created by Benedict XVI
 Cardinals created by Francis

 Cardinal electors in the 2013 papal conclave 
 Council of Cardinal Advisers
 List of creations of cardinals
 Suburbicarian diocese
 Titular church (List of titular churches)

Notes

References

External links 
 
 Holy See Press Office, The College of Cardinals
 GCatholic.org, College of Cardinals

Current
+